Superman: Tower of Power is a drop tower ride currently located at two Six Flags parks, and two former installments at Kentucky Kingdom and Six Flags St. Louis. Two of the four drop towers were manufactured by Intamin, while the Six Flags Over Georgia version was made by Zamperla, and the Six Flags Over Texas version was made by S&S. The installment at Kentucky Kingdom (then known as Six Flags Kentucky Kingdom) was demolished after an accident that maimed a teenage girl while the ride at Six Flags St Louis was removed from the park's website in early 2021. Three additional drop towers of the same model by S&S are installed at other Six Flags parks Six Flags New England and Six Flags Fiesta Texas,  each known as Scream and one more built at Six Flags Great Escape and Hurricane Harbor known as Sasquatch.

Kentucky Kingdom

The Superman: Tower of Power at Kentucky Kingdom (park then operating as Six Flags Kentucky Kingdom) was an Intamin Giant Drop model, nearly identical to the one at Six Flags St. Louis. It opened in 1995 as the first ride of its kind. The ride was constructed by Martin & Vleminckx. The original name for this ride was "Hellevator", but it was renamed "Superman: Tower of Power" in 2007 and received a fresh coat of paint at the top of the ride. The same year it was refurbished, its life was cut short after a major accident. The ride was dismantled in 2008.

A new 129-foot drop tower, called "FearFall", was later added to the park in 2014.

Rider experience
Riders sit in one of four seats in several cars attached to the tower.

Stats
Introduced: 1995
Demolished: 2008
Height: 177 ft (54 m)
Drop height: 154 ft (47 m)
Max speed: 54 mph (87 km/h)
Lift speed: 12 mph (19 km/h)
Manufacturer: Intamin
Height restriction: 48 in (122 cm)

Incidents

On June 21, 2007, a 13-year-old girl was severely injured on Superman: Tower of Power when a cable snapped shortly after the ride began, striking the passengers in Section 3 of the ride. The cable became entangled around the girl's feet during the drop, shattering her left femur and severing both feet. Ride operators heard the cable snap and acknowledged unusual screaming as the car climbed, but failed to press the emergency stop button until after the ride had already dropped. The ride cannot be stopped once the carriage begins to drop. Her right foot was successfully reattached, but not her left, which required amputation below the left knee.

Following the accident, the ride was closed indefinitely. Other drop tower rides around the country temporarily closed for inspection, including Drop Tower rides at five Cedar Fair parks. On November 29, 2007, Six Flags Kentucky Kingdom announced that Superman: Tower of Power would be demolished completely. The attraction was removed prior to the 2008 season.

On May 14, 2008, the girl's family spoke and gave support for a bill introduced by Massachusetts State Representative Ed Markey on Capitol Hill, which would have allowed the federal government to oversee permanent rides at amusement parks. The family sued Six Flags and reached a confidential settlement on November 21, 2008, with one of the terms requiring Six Flags to provide a lifetime of care for the injured girl.

Six Flags Over Georgia
This is the second attraction themed to Superman to operate at the park, with the first one being Superman: Ultimate Flight.

Stats
Introduced: 2016
Total height: 65 ft (20 m)
Manufacturer: Zamperla
Height restriction: 42 in (107 cm)

Six Flags Over Texas

Superman Tower of Power at Six Flags Over Texas in Arlington, Texas was added to the Tower section of the park in 2003.

It features three towers: blue, red, and yellow positioned so that ride resembles a tripod like structure. Riders are seated facing outwards and are strapped using air-locked shoulder restraints and a safety belt that attaches the restraint to the seat. The ride begins with the weigh process. During this time the cart is raised and lowered as the ride's computer determines the amount of air pressure to use for the ride cycle. Once completed, there is a brief pause and the riders are then launched up the tower (Space Shot) then slow just before reaching the top. This is the first feeling of weightlessness that the riders experience. The cart briskly falls halfway down the tower then brought back up to the top to complete the Turbo Drop portion of the ride. Once at the top the cart locks into the brakes and is held there giving the riders just enough time to view both the Dallas and Fort Worth skylines. The cart is then released from the brakes, and the riders are dropped giving them the second and final experience of weightlessness. The riders are then bounced halfway up the tower and dropped again until they are slowly brought back down to be unloaded.

At night the ride is illuminated by various lights that change color and can be seen for miles.

Stats
Introduced: March 29, 2003
Total height: 325 ft (99 m)
Structural height: 313 ft (95 m)
Drop height: 245 ft (74 m)
Top Speed: 55 mph (89 km/h)
G-force: min -1.0 g, max +4.0
Manufacturer: S&S Worldwide
Height restriction: 52 in (132 cm)

Six Flags St. Louis
The Superman: Tower of Power at Six Flags St. Louis was manufactured by Intamin, and was one of Intamin's "Giant Drop" models. Riders sat in open-air ski lift style seats that face away from the tower, leaving their feet dangling. The cars lifted up slowly at first, but quickly accelerated to 12 mph (19 km/h) after leaving the magnetic brakes. Riders were held at the top of the 23-story tower for several seconds at the top.  The cars were then released in a random order and free fall some 230 ft (70 m), reaching 62 mph (100 km/h) before hitting the brakes.

Stats
Introduced: May 19, 2006
Height: 227 ft (69 m)
Drop height: 217 ft (66 m)
Free fall distance: 230 ft (70 m)
Free fall speed: 65 mph (104.607 km/h)
Ride Duration: 1 min, 50 sec
Capacity: 6 cars that hold 4 passengers each, for a total of 24 riders per cycle
Manufacturer: Intamin
Height restriction: 48 in (122 cm)

History
 The ride was originally operated at Six Flags AstroWorld in Houston, Texas, where it was known as the "Dungeon Drop". When AstroWorld was closed and demolished in 2005, Dungeon Drop was relocated to Six Flags St. Louis.
 The ride was originally intended to be named "Acrophobia". The tower pieces were painted in an alternating color scheme of orange, green, and teal with white accent ringsprior to being erected at the park during the off-season. When CEO Mark Shapiro made his stop at the park on his national tour of the Six Flags parks in 2006, he ordered the name change to Superman: Tower of Power and the tower was repainted again, but in an alternating color scheme of yellow, blue and red with yellow and blue accent rings.
The ride was closed on June 22, 2007 after the accident occurred on the Kentucky Kingdom location.

The ride was removed from the park website in 2021.

References

External links

 Superman: Tower of Power at the Six Flags Over Texas Official Website
 Superman: Tower of Power at the Six Flags St. Louis Official Website

Drop tower rides
Six Flags attractions
Tower of Power
Kentucky Kingdom
Six Flags Over Georgia
Six Flags Over Texas
Six Flags St. Louis
Towers completed in 1995
Towers completed in 2003
Towers completed in 2006
Amusement rides based on film franchises
Amusement rides based on television franchises
Amusement rides manufactured by Intamin
Amusement rides manufactured by S&S – Sansei Technologies
Warner Bros. Global Brands and Experiences attractions